Shawanga Lodge was a Catskills mountain hotel operated from 1923 to 1972, part of the Borscht Belt hotels located in Highview NY.

The cottages were built on cinder blocks above ground and had above ground piping and received chlorinated water from the lake.  The main building still had most bathrooms on the floor, no heat but had well water. The 1957 renovation was needed but not enough. The rooms in the cottages and newer Panorama and Holiday Inn (not the chain motel) buildings had air cooling and heat but were not connected to the main building. The rooms in the main building were small and some had air conditioning and private bath. In 1972 Alvin Atlass decided to leave the hotel business.  It was too much risk for Abby Dan to run the hotel alone and in Sept of 1972 the hotel went bankrupt.  It was sold at auction Abby Dan tried to help the new owner open for the 1973 season. The hotel did not open and in September 1973 the hotel burned in a suspicious fire. It was noted that the water tower which operated the sprinkler system was drained.

The original main building was heated by fireplace, the newer one had no heat.  The cottages had no heat and had above ground pipe.  Thus, the hotel was only open in the late spring to early fall.

In September 2021 the lodge site was acquired by a land conservation group, Open Space Initiative, which stated that is intends to transfer ownership to the New York state Department of Environmental Conservation.

Hotel construction 
Construction of Catskill hotels in the days before sprinkler systems and modern heating systems consisted of may separate buildings built at a distance.  Buildings often burned. In Shawanga's case, the main building burned due to a chimney fire around 1923–1926.  As the resort consisted of  many buildings, it was not a total loss.

Main building 
The main building, built in 1926 and renovated in 1957 had approximately 123 rooms.  Most rooms had a shared bathroom on the floor.  The main building had well water and while some rooms had AC, none had heat.

1957 renovation  
Construction began after the 1957 season and proceeded during the winter. Previously the hotel catered to singles, after the renovation, the hotel catered to families.

Day camp 
The camp was located about 3/4 of a mile away from the main building by the lake.  There was a section for the older kids and younger.  There was a nursery that was across from the main building.

Summers at Shawanga 
There were many guests who spent their entire summer at the hotel, this was common at the Catskills up until the end of the 70's.  Fathers would send their wives and kids and visit on the weekends.

References

External links
 Tribute website
The Catskills Institute
Interview of former Shawanga Lodge employee

Defunct hotels in New York (state)
Hotels established in 1923
Borscht Belt